Putin. Corruption. is an independent report on alleged corruption in Vladimir Putin’s inner circle published by the leaders of opposition liberal democratic People's Freedom Party in Russia. The report was presented by them at the press conference on 28 March 2011. This is the first large-scale project of the People’s Freedom Party. 

The report has been compiled by co-chairmen of the party Vladimir Milov, Boris Nemtsov and Vladimir Ryzhkov, as well as the press secretary of the Russian Solidarnost (“Solidarity”) movement Olga Shorina.

Contents of the report
The report describes the alleged enrichment of Vladimir Putin and his friends, including the 26 palaces and five yachts used by Putin and Medvedev. Table of contents:

 Introduction 
 The Enrichment of the Members of the Ozero Dacha Condominium
 Putin and his Billionaire Friends
 Two Slaves on a Gilded Galley
Yachts 
Villas and Palaces 
Watches 
Homes and Cars
 Conclusion

Publication
The publication of the report is carried out on fundraising from the public. To this end, an account has been opened on Yandex.Money, the money transfer service operated by Yandex. The fundraising is overseen by a supervisory board, which includes editor-in-chief of Novaya Gazeta Dmitry Muratov, journalist Oleg Kashin, economist Irina Yasina, and writer and blogger Oleg Kozyrev. During first month 1,838,209 rubles was collected. 

On 13 April a tender was held to choose the printing house. The winning bid came from the printing house, which offered the lowest price for printing of one copy, 4.05 rubles. Thus, taking into account 3% commission of Yandex, it will be possible to print 440,000 copies. 

The account remains open and the fundraising is continuing. The account number mentioned on the covers of the brochures. 

The report is also available on the website. There one can find information on the fundraising, news and videos. On the same site, there are also other reports on Vladimir Putin. 

A grey-brown colour was chosen for the cover. According to Vladimir Ryzhkov, it "symbolises the substance flooding over our country and rust, which has covered our state".

Distribution

In June the first batch of the press run on public donations was ready. The distribution was launched on 11 June in Vladimir. The next day, a large distribution of brochures was held in Moscow during the action of "Solidarity" movement dedicated to the Russia Day. Boris Nemtsov participated in both of these events.

On 16 and 17 June police detained opposition activists, who intended to give the report to participants of the St. Petersburg International Economic Forum. The police claimed that the activists held an unsanctioned rally. Another activist was detained on 23 June in Moscow.

Previous reports
Earlier, Boris Nemtsov and Vladimir Milov published the following reports: 
 Putin. Results. 10 years. - June 2010. Translated into English as Putin: What 10 Years of Putin Have Brought. This is a revised edition of the report Putin. Results, which came out in 2008. 
 Luzhkov. Results - September 2009 (first edition) 
 Sochi and the Olympics - April 2009 
 Putin and the Crisis - February 2009 
 Putin and Gazprom - September 2008 
 Putin. Results - February 2008

See also
Political groups under Vladimir Putin's presidency

References

External links
 Putin: What 10 Years of Putin Have Brought. Translated by Dave Essel

Opposition to Vladimir Putin
Vladimir Putin
Corruption in Russia
Politics of Russia
People's Freedom Party "For Russia without Lawlessness and Corruption"